Hamari Beti Uska Kal Yojna (trans. Our daughter her future) was a government of Uttar Pradesh marriage aid scheme for girls launched by former CM of Uttar Pradesh Akhilesh Yadav.

History 
This Scheme was launched on 10 december 2012 in Rampur on the occasion of Mohammad Ali Jauhar's birth anniversary at Mohammad Ali Jauhar University.

Muhammad Azam Khan gave this scheme name as Hamari Beti Uska Kal.

Scheme 
In this scheme government provide one time 30 thousand rupees funds to highschool passout minority girls to continue their studies or for their marriage.

See also 

 Government of Uttar Pradesh
 Kamdhenu Yojna

References 

Government schemes in Uttar Pradesh